Willy Kurant (15 February 1934 – 3 April 2021) was a Belgian cinematographer.

Kurant began as a documentary cameraman before establishing himself as a director of photography for such filmmakers as Agnès Varda, Jean-Luc Godard, Orson Welles, Alain Robbe-Grillet, Jerzy Skolimowski, Chris Marker and Maurice Pialat. Kurant also collaborated extensively with musician Serge Gainsbourg.

Kurant was a member of the French Society of Cinematographers and the American Society of Cinematographers.

Biography
Kurant was born in 1934 in Liège, Belgium, the son of two Polish immigrants, Jankiel Icek Kurant and Tema Feuer. Kurant lived in Liège until the age of eight, when, due to World War II, he was forced to move to the Belgian countryside with his older sister and her husband. Kurant was later sent to an orphanage, where he lived until the age of 17. As a teen, Kurant read issues of American Cinematographer magazine at an American Cultural Center.He was the nephew of the German cinematographer Curt Courant (1899-1968).

Kurant was initially reluctant to pursue a career as a cinematographer, instead studying still photography. While working at a job processing film at a research lab in France, Kurant took an evening class at a small film school; it was then that he decided to pursue cinematography as a career.

Kurant began his career as a cameraman in 1954, when he spent six months in the Belgian Congo as part of a documentary film crew. There, he worked on ten short propaganda films produced for the Ministry of Overseas France and her Colonies, and upon returning to Belgium, Kurant worked as a news cameraman for a television station. In 1957, Kurant received a scholarship to study as a trainee cameraman at Pinewood Studios. There, he worked as first assistant cameraman to English cinematographers Geoffrey Unsworth (on A Night to Remember), Harry Waxman (on Innocent Sinners) and Jack Hildyard (on The Gypsy and the Gentleman).

At the 1958 World's Fair in Brussels, Kurant saw a German film crew using an Arriflex camera. This inspired Kurant to buy a camera of his own, as well as a set of lenses and a sound recorder. He then worked extensively as a freelance cameraman, travelling to Vietnam and again to the Congo. In 1962, Kurant moved to France to formally study cinematography.

Kurant then began to establish himself as a cinematographer, shooting shorts for filmmakers such as Jacques Rozier and Marin Karmitz. In 1966, Kurant shot his first two features: Agnès Varda's The Creatures and Jean-Luc Godard's Masculin Feminin. Both films were shot in high-contrast black-and-white on 4X, a then-new Kodak film stock; Kurant later referred to the films' distinctive look as his "signature."

The next year, Kurant shot the TV movie Anna, directed by Pierre Koralnik starring Godard's ex-wife, Anna Karina. The film was co-written and scored by musician Serge Gainsbourg; this marked the first of several film collaborations between Kurant and Gainsbourg.

Around the same time, Kurant served as the cinematographer on Orson Welles' French production, The Immortal Story. Welles then hired Kurant as the cinematographer for his thriller The Deep, which spent three years in production but was never finished.

In 1968, Kurant shot his first American film, The Night of the Following Day. In the 1980s, he worked on two films with director Maurice Pialat: A Nos Amours, from which Kurant was fired after two weeks of shooting, and the Palme d'Or-winning Under the Sun of Satan. He also worked on Boris Szulzinger's Mama Dracula (1980).

Later in his career, Kurant shot a handful of films in the United States, including The Baby-Sitters Club and Pootie Tang. His most recent feature is Un été brûlant (2011), directed by Philippe Garrel; it marked Kurant's first work in seven years.

References

Externals

1934 births
2021 deaths
Belgian cinematographers
Film people from Liège